Herbert Lars Gustaf Tingsten (17 March 1896 – 26 December 1973) was a Swedish political scientist, writer and newspaper publisher. An influential figure in Swedish political science, he was a professor of political science at Stockholm University from 1935 to 1946, and executive editor of the newspaper Dagens Nyheter from 1946 to 1959.

Career
Herbert Tingsten was born in Järfälla, Stockholm County, the son of city servant Karl Tingsten and his wife Elin Bergenstjerna. He finished his doctoral thesis in 1923 while working as secretary in the Swedish parliament's Committee on the Constitution. As a political scientist his main fields included constitutional history, constitutional law and the history of ideas.

Tingsten changed his political views several times during his life. In his early youth he was a conservative and later a radical left-wing liberal. During the 1920s he joined the Swedish Social Democratic Party and was on the left-wing faction of the party. In 1941 he wrote Den svenska socialdemokratiens idéutveckling ("The Development of the Idea of Swedish Social Democracy"). However, after reading Friedrich Hayek's The Road to Serfdom in 1944, Tingsten became a convinced believer in a free market economy and in 1945 he left the Social Democratic Party.

He was one of the original participators of the Mont Pelerin Society, founded in 1947.

Tingsten was an early opponent of Nazism, which he warned against during the early 1930s, as well as of the threat of Communism. During his time as executive editor of Dagens Nyheter, Tingsten argued for Swedish membership in NATO. He also supported Israel.

In a number of books and publications, Tingsten anticipated some of the major issues in the political developments of the 20th century, such as the rise of fascism, apartheid in South Africa, the transition of socialism into social democracy as well as the need for democratic vitality in Western societies. Tingsten had a deep erudition in both Anglo-Saxon and Continental European science and literature. He created the concept of political behaviour in his 1936 book, pioneering the analysis of election statistics.

Published works
Note: The following list includes original editions only, not later published or translated editions.

  [The referendum institution in United States of North America (sic)]
  [Constitutional warrant laws in modern parliaments]
 [Prohibition law results in the United States of North America (sic)]
  [Studies over the constitutional committee's decharge procedure : some questions in connection to later praxis]
  [American democracy : constitution of the United States State-life]
  [Studies regarding ministerial governance]
  [The governmental expansion during and after the world war : studies on constitutional warrant laws]
  [From parliamentarism to dictatorship : The fascist conquest of Italy]
  [Investigation regarding the introduction of an agenda institute among other things ]
  [The national dictatorship : The nazi and fascist ideas]
 
  [The conservative ideas]
  [The Development of the Idea of Swedish Social Demcracy]
  [Idea critique]
  [Problems in Swedish democracy]
  [Current federation states]
  [Debate regarding Nordic unity]
  [Swedish foreign policy debate between the world wars]
  [English colonial debate]
  [Peace and security after the second world war : a Swedish discussion post]
  [Democracy's problem]
  [Problems in the USA]
  [Argument]
  [The Revolution's inheritors : South American perspective]
  [Problems in West Germany]
 
  [Ideas and geniuses]
  [Problems in South Africa]
  [Parties and Politics]
  [Japan]
  [The threatened Israel]
  [On the war path]
  [At the market place]
  [Opinions and motives]
  [My life]
  [Should the royal power be strengthened : critique of the constitutional recommendation]
  [Victoria and the Victorians]
  [When Churchill ceased power and other essays]
  [From idea to idyll : the happy democracy]
  [Struggle around the idyll]
  [Notices on life and death]
  [Journal from America]
  [My political horizon and other essays]
  [God and fatherland : studies of a hundred years of school propaganda]
  [When dusk falls]
  [Perspective on business debate]
  [Companion for my thoughts]
  [Escape attempt(s?) : notices 1971-1972]

References

1896 births
1973 deaths
People from Järfälla Municipality
Swedish political scientists
Academic staff of Stockholm University
Swedish political writers
Swedish newspaper publishers (people)
Swedish republicans
Dagens Nyheter editors
Member of the Mont Pelerin Society
20th-century political scientists